The 1929 CCNY Lavender football team was an American football team that represented the City College of New York (CCNY) as an independent during the 1929 college football season. In their sixth season under Harold J. Parker, the Lavender team compiled a 2–4–2 record.

Schedule

References

CCNY
CCNY Beavers football seasons
CCNY Lavender football